Sergeant Major Gilbert "Hashmark" Johnson (October 30, 1905 – August 5, 1972) was one of the first African Americans to enlist in the United States Marine Corps and one of the first African American drill instructors in the Marine Corps. Johnson was known as “Hashmark” because he had more service stripes than rank stripes. He retired in 1959 after 32 years of service in the U.S. armed forces, including 17 years as a Marine.

Early years
Gilbert Johnson was born on October 30, 1905, to a farming family in rural Mount Hebron, Alabama. He attended Stillman College in 1922, aspiring to become a minister, but he left college the following year to join the U.S. Army.

Military service

Johnson enlisted in the 25th Infantry Regiment in 1923, serving two three-year tours. At the end of his enlistment in October 1929, Johnson was discharged as a corporal.

After four years of civilian life, he decided to join the U.S. Navy. In 1933, he enlisted in the Naval Reserve and was accepted into the Stewards Branch, the only job available to blacks at that time, where he served in the Navy for nearly 10 years. In May 1941, he entered the regular Navy. Johnson served aboard the USS Wyoming at the time of the bombing of Pearl Harbor.

In 1941, President Franklin D. Roosevelt issued Executive Order 8802, requiring the Marine Corps to accept blacks and forbidding discrimination by military contractors. That year Johnson requested transfer from the U.S. Navy to the United States Marine Corps. Initially he and other African Americans served in segregated units. He went on to serve the last 17 years of his 32-year military career in the Marine Corps. He earned his nickname because during his initial Marine Corps training at Montford Point, he wore three service stripes (hashmarks) on the sleeve of his uniform, indicating his previous enlistments in the Army and Navy.

In 1943, Johnson was among the first black men to be trained as Marine drill instructors. In May 1943 at Montford Point, he replaced drill instructor First Sergeant Robert W. Colwell. As a member of the 52d Defense Battalion, on Guam in World War II, Johnson asked that black Marines be assigned to combat patrols, from which they had been exempt. Once approved, he personally led 25 combat patrols.

Edgar Huff, the only other black sergeant major besides Johnson to serve during World War II, was Johnson's brother-in-law. They were married to twin sisters.

Honors
Two years after Johnson died from a heart attack, the Montford Point facility at Camp Lejeune, North Carolina, was renamed Camp Gilbert H. Johnson in his honor. It was the first military installation to be named after an African American.

See also

List of African-American firsts
Frederick C. Branch, the first African American officer in the Marine Corps

References

External links
 Who's Who in Marine Corps History
 Arlington National Cemetery

1905 births
1972 deaths
United States Navy sailors
United States Marine Corps non-commissioned officers
United States Navy personnel of World War II
United States Marine Corps personnel of World War II
United States Marine Corps personnel of the Korean War
People from Marshall County, Alabama
Military personnel from Alabama
Stillman College alumni
Burials at Arlington National Cemetery
African-American United States Navy personnel
African Americans in World War II
African Americans in the Korean War
United States Army non-commissioned officers